Bow Lake is a small lake in western Alberta, Canada. It is located on the Bow River, in the Canadian Rockies, at an altitude of 1920 m.

The lake lies south of the Bow Summit, east of the Waputik Range (views including Wapta Icefield, Bow Glacier, Bow Peak, Mount Thompson, Crowfoot Glacier and Crowfoot Mountain) and west of the Dolomite Pass, Dolomite Peak and Cirque Peak.

Bow Lake is one of the lakes that line the Icefields Parkway in Banff National Park and Jasper National Park, other such lakes being Hector Lake, Lake Louise, Peyto Lake, Mistaya Lake, Waterfowl Lakes, Chephren Lake and Sunwapta Lake.

Historical Simpson's Num-Ti-Jah Lodge is located on the shores of Bow Lake at the foot of Mount Jimmy Simpson.

Bow Lake is the closest lake to the headwaters of Bow River, and has a total area of 3.21 km2. Water in the lake is meltwater of the Bow Glacier and its turquoise colouring is due to glacial till.

Image gallery

See also
Lakes of Alberta

References

Banff National Park
Bow River
Lakes of Alberta
Mountain lakes
Glacial lakes of Canada